The 2008–09 season is the Newcastle Jets' first season of football (soccer) in Australia's new women's league, the W-League.

Season

Fixtures

Round 1

Round 2

Round 3

Round 4

Round 5

Round 6

Round 7

Round 8

Round 9

Round 10

Standings

Players

Leading scorers
The leading goal scores from the regular season.

Finals series

Bracket

Semi-final

Final

Milestones
First game = 2–1 win home V Canberra United
Largest win = 4–1 win home V Perth Glory
Largest loss = 3–2 loss away V Adelaide United

Newcastle Jets FC (A-League Women) seasons
Newcastle Jets W-League